Darwinysius is a genus of true bugs belonging to the family Lygaeidae.

Species:

Darwinysius marginalis 
Darwinysius wenmanensis

References

Lygaeidae